Reserved track, in tram transport terminology, is track on ground exclusively for trams (in the US, typically called a "private right-of-way").

Description

Unlike street running track embedded in streets and roads, reserved track does not need to take into account the transit of other wheeled vehicles, pedestrians, bicyclists or horses. It is the cheapest form of tram track to install (not counting land acquisition costs), and usually is constructed like railway track with conventional sleepers (railroad ties).

Many modern tramway/light rail systems operate over reserved track formerly forming part of a heavy-rail network, e.g. Manchester, London and Nottingham (UK) and Sydney,  Melbourne, and Adelaide in Australia. 

Tram transport track can be either reserved track or street running type.

Semi-reserved track
An intermediate form, whereby tramlines are laid in the middle of a road, and segregated from other road users either by being raised approximately 10 centimetres above street level, and/or with small studs, or simply by a painted white line. This space is normally for trams only, or for trams, buses, taxis and emergency vehicles. However ordinary traffic may cross into the tram lane to pass parked vehicles. In Belgium this is known as a bijzondere overrijdbare bedding or site spécial franchissable. The tram lane may be roughened by paving it with cobbles as an additional deterrent to use by rubber-tyred vehicles.

See also
 Street running, where trams or other vehicles share a right of way on a road or street
 Tramway track

References

Tram transport
Tram technology